This list of animated feature films consists of animated films produced or released by Paramount Pictures.

Paramount releases films from Paramount-owned and non-Paramount owned animation studios. Most films listed below are from Paramount Animation which began as a feature animation department of Paramount in 2015. Paramount has also released animated films by other production companies, such as DreamWorks Animation (which is now owned by Universal Pictures).

Other Studio units have also released films theatrically, primarily Fleischer Studios, Famous Studios and Nickelodeon Movies, and the studio's distribution unit, which acquires film rights from outside animation studios to release films under the Paramount label.

Films

US releases

International Releases

Upcoming

Highest grossing films
This list does not include films produced by DreamWorks Animation, which are now owned by Universal Pictures.

Notes
Release Notes

Studio/Production Notes

See also
List of Paramount Pictures films

References

External links

American animated films
Feature
Animation
Lists of Paramount Pictures films
Lists of American animated films